José Gerardo Amorín Batlle (born 9 November 1954 in Montevideo) is an Uruguayan lawyer and politician who has served as Minister of Education and Culture (2004–2005), representative (2005–2010) and senator (since 2010).

Biography 

Amorín is a member of the Colorado Party and comes from a political family; his father, Julio Amorín Larrañagahimself a relative of Javier Barrios Amorínwas minister in Juan María Bordaberry's government and his mother, Susana Batlle, was a close relative of president Jorge Batlle.

References

External links

1954 births
People from Montevideo
Uruguayan people of Portuguese descent
Uruguayan people of Catalan descent
University of the Republic (Uruguay) alumni
20th-century Uruguayan lawyers
Colorado Party (Uruguay) politicians
Education and Culture Ministers of Uruguay
Living people
Members of the Chamber of Representatives of Uruguay
Presidents of the Chamber of Representatives of Uruguay
Members of the Senate of Uruguay
Candidates for President of Uruguay
People educated at The British Schools of Montevideo